Alan Jackson (19 November 1933 – 24 March 1974) was a British cyclist. He competed at the 1956 Summer Olympics, winning a silver medal in the team road race event and a bronze in the individual event.

References

1933 births
1974 deaths
British male cyclists
Olympic cyclists of Great Britain
Cyclists at the 1956 Summer Olympics
Sportspeople from Stockport
Olympic silver medallists for Great Britain
Olympic bronze medallists for Great Britain
Olympic medalists in cycling
Medalists at the 1956 Summer Olympics
20th-century British people